Old Ningo is a town in the Greater Accra Region of Ghana.

History
Also known as Great Ningo, the inhabitants have always been a fishing and farming community. They form part of the Ga-Adangbe people. The name Ningo has a much more widely known and accepted history as derived from the Ga–Dangme words nu meaning water and ngoo meaning salt. The "nu" and "ngoo" story rather interesting is not as compelling as evidence which points to a more interesting origin. A publication in the Encyclopædia Metropolitana published in 1817 has this entry."Ningo, near which the second Danish castle, Friedensburg, is placed, is 43 miles from Akra. In Krob6, or Krepe, a large Negro State behind it, there is a very high mountain about 20 or 25 miles distant from the sea, and capped with snow". It gives evidence to a voyager's inspired name as the name Ningo happens to be Latin for snow (Ningo in Latin), and as it goes the mariners would have seen the mountain in the backdrop of the  native settlers and named the place Ningo.  Many other early writings and references on Ningo also used the term Grande in the form Ningo Grande (grande) translate in Latin as large or great. The name Great Ningo naturally follows. The people of Ningo like to refer themselves as "Nugoli" meaning "People of Nugo" (Nugo being a much more locally accepted pronunciation of the name Ningo) and are proud to associate themselves with the name Great Ningo.  The history of the people of Ningo is closely linked to the history of the Ga-Dangme people.

Aboriginal name of Ningo
The original name  of people of Ningo is Lasibi. This is part of the 8 groups of people who are identified as Dangme State. Adaa, Nugo, Gbugbla, Kpom, SƐ, Yilô-Klo, Manya-Klo and Osudoku; anglicised as: Ada, Ningo, Prampram, Kpone, Shai, Yilo Krobo, Manya Krobo and Osudoku respectively.

Fort Fredensborg

The Danish were the first European settlers here, establishing the Fort Fredensborg in 1734. The town was developed as a slave trading station as part of Danish Guinea . However, with the abolition of the slave trade the town dwindled in size, with the fort staffed by a single person. The fort was already in ruins when the British took over on 8 March 1850 and incorporated the town into the Gold Coast.
Christian Glob Dorf was Commandant from 21 June 1740 to 25 May 1743.

Ningo Clans
Ningo has 4 Divisions and clans under them.
First Division:Lower.
They hold the paramount chief position and djange wↄnↄ (priest). Clans under LowƐ are:
Adainya (Djangma We)
Asere
We Gobom
Ohenease (Ohluase)
Saunya
Aniamosi
Ma Momonor
 
Second Division: Lower Kponↄ
They hold the Dzaase/Dzaas-TsƐ Position. Clans under Lowe Kponor are:
Odoi We (Mantse We)
Obonu We
Huago We
Adela We (Salosi)
Okubeng We
Tsawe - Se Agbla-nya
Osabunya
 
Third Division:  Djangmaku 
They hold divisional chief position.
Clans under Djangmaku are:
Adade We
Djange PiƐse
Saunsi
Dankyira
Kabueku
Suↄ Yi - nya
Manya Tsu
Manya Gↄtsonya (Akamisa wem)
 
Fourth Division: Kabiawe.
They hold mankralo position.
Clans under Kabiawe are:
LƐ Wem (Kↄↄley Tso sisi)
Anarhor
Alata (Akwadu-tso nya)
Bantama
Manya Yum (Mankralo Wem)

Education
The town is also known for the Ningo High and Technical School regarded as having a pleasant environment.  The school is a second cycle institution.

References

External links

Populated places in the Greater Accra Region